Lincoln Tower may refer to:

Lincoln Tower, a skyscraper at Lincoln Center in Oregon, United States
Lincoln Bank Tower, an Art-Deco skyscraper in Indiana, United States
Lincoln Memorial Tower, a nineteenth-century building in London, United Kingdom
The Towers (Ohio State), a dormitory at Ohio State University known as Lincoln Tower